Pierre Bec (11 December 1921 – 30 June 2014) was a French Occitan-language poet and linguist. Born in Paris, he spent his childhood in Comminges, where he learnt Occitan. He was deported to Germany between 1943 and 1945. After returning, he studied in Paris, where he graduated in 1959. He was one of the founders of the IEO or Institut d'Estudis Occitans (Institute of Occitan Studies) as well as its president from 1962 to 1980.

Life
Pierre Bec spent his childhood in Cazères-sur-Garonne where he learned Gascon. In 1938, he was an interpreter for the Spanish Republican refugees who had crossed the Pyrenees, and he discovered Catalan. He was deported in March 1943 to Germany as part of the compulsory labor service.

Bec was titular professor at Poitiers university and assistant director of the Centre d'Études Supérieures de Civilisation Médiévale (Centre for high studies in medieval civilisation). He is considered one of the most important specialists in Occitan dialectology and in mediaeval Occitan literature. His activity is distributed among Occitanist politics, philological research and literary creation. He collaborated with publications like Cahiers de Civilisation Médiévale, Revue de Linguistique Romane, Estudis Romànics, Oc.

In 1982 he took part in the Linguistic Normalisation commission for Aranese, with Jacme Taupiac and Miquèu Grosclaude: they established some linguistics norms, officialised in 1983, following IEO's indications for Gascon.

Bec died in Poitiers on 30 June 2014, at the age of 92.

Importance for Gallo-Cisalpine language(s) 
As a linguist, Pierre Bec stated, within his Manuel pratique de Philologie romane (2nd volume, p. 316) that some kind of diachronical unity holds between Rhaeto-Romance languages (i.e. Romansh, Friulian and Ladin) and Northern Italian or Cisalpine ones (Western Lombard, Eastern Lombard, Piedmontese, Venetan, Emiliano-Romagnolo and Ligurian). This issue has been further investigated by the Australian linguist Geoffrey Hull.

Works

Literature

 Petite anthologie de la lyrique occitane du Moyen Âge (1954)
 Les saluts d'amour du troubadour Arnaud de Mareuil (1961) (editor) 
 La langue occitane (1963)
 Burlesque et obscénité chez les troubadours (1984)
 Chants d'amour des femmes troubadours (1995) (Anthologist)
 Au briu de l'estona (1955) poetry
 Sonets barròcs entà Iseut (1979) poetry
 Lo hiu tibat (1978) Novel
 Sebastian (1980)  Novel
 Raconte d’una mort tranquilla (1993) Short Story
 Contes de l'unic (1977) Short Story

Linguistics
 Manuel pratique d'occitan moderne (Picard, 1973; 2e édition 1983)
 Manuel pratique de philologie romane (Picard, 1970 (vol. 1), 1971 (vol. 2) - reedit. 2000)
 Les Interférences linguistiques entre gascon et languedocien dans les parlers du Comminges et du Couserans (PUF, 1968): Essai d'aréologie systématique.

See also
Occitan language
Aranese
Gallo-Italic languages

References

Occitan-language writers
Occitan linguists
2014 deaths
1921 births
20th-century French poets
Academic staff of the University of Poitiers
French male poets
20th-century French male writers